Estar Khu (also Romanized as Estar Khū; also known as Estakhr Khū) is a village in Kalat-e Hay-ye Sharqi Rural District, in the Central District of Meyami County, Semnan Province, Iran. At the 2006 census, its population was 120, in 32 families.

References 

Populated places in Meyami County